Paul Berger (6 January 1845 Beaucourt, Territoire de Belfort – 1908) was a French physician and surgeon who practised in Paris at the Hôpital Tenon and was Professor of Clinical Surgery and Pathology at the Faculté de médecine de Paris. He is noted for Berger's operation, a method of interscapulothoracic amputation, and for improvements in hernia/intestinal suturing.

Life
Berger was a French physician and surgeon who practised in Paris at the Hôpital Tenon and was Professor of Clinical Surgery and Pathology at the Faculté de médecine de Paris. He developed a method of interscapulothoracic amputation, called Berger's operation after him, and for improvements in hernia/intestinal suturing.

In October 1882 Berger amputated the whole upper limb of a patient with an enchondroma of the humerus, publishing a report the following year. In 1887 he published “L’Amputation du Membre Superieur dans la Contiguite du Tronc”, a detailed monograph on forequarter amputation. In the paper's historical review, Berger credited Ralph Cuming as the originator of the operation. Berger noted only two prior such operations for war injuries, by Cuming in 1808 and by Gaetani Bey in Cairo some thirty years later.

In 1889 a public display of aseptic instruments was held at the Exposition Universelle (1889) in Paris. Berger noted that 
"it is impossible not to be struck by the complete transformation that surgical instrument making has undergone in the past few years. This renovation of our instrumentation was the consequence of the revolution that antisepsis introduced in surgical practice; it has been necessary to create entirely new equipment that meets and exceeds the conditions that surgeons consider essential." Berger drew special attention to the various designs for scissor-like articulations that French instrument makers had devised so that they could easily be disassembled for cleaning.

Surgical mask use

Berger began to don a surgical mask while operating in October 1897. He read a paper "On the Use of a Mask in Operating" before the Surgical Society of Paris on February 22, 1899. He began with the statement:

Berger had been alerted by some cases of suppuration after otherwise clean operations with an assistant suffering from an alveolar abscess. A similar situation arose some months later, when Berger himself was afflicted by dental periostitis. He also noticed drops of saliva projected from the surgeon or assistant when speaking. Conscious of Carl Flügge's discovery of pathogens in saliva, he determined to shield his operation incisions from this cause of contamination, and in October 1897 began to wear "a rectangular compress of six layers of gauze, sewn at its lower edge to his sterilized linen apron (he had a beard to safeguard) and the upper border held against the root of the nose by strings tied behind the neck." Over a period of fifteen months he became convinced that the incidence of infection had been reduced. He ended his paper with:
 

The notion of a surgeon's mouth being a rich source of infection was ridiculed, by a Monsieur Terrier scoffing that "I have never worn a mask, and quite certainly I never shall do so."

Books
"Chirurgie orthopédique" - Paul Berger, S. Banzet (Paris, 1904)

References

1845 births
1908 deaths
People from the Territoire de Belfort
French surgeons
Medical hygiene